This is a list of the butterflies of family Nymphalidae, or the "browns", which are found in Europe. It is a part of the List of the butterflies of Europe

Subfamily Nymphalinae
Tribe Junoniini
Diadem, Hypolimnas misippus (Linnaeus, 1764) Canary Islands, Madeira

Tribe Nymphalini
European peacock, Aglais io (Linnaeus 1758)
Small tortoiseshell, Aglais urticae (Linnaeus 1758)
Sardinian small tortoiseshell, Aglais ichnusa (Bonelli, 1826)
Map butterfly, Araschnia levana (Linnaeus 1758)
White petticoat, Nymphalis antiopa (Linnaeus 1758)
Large tortoiseshell, Nymphalis polychloros (Linnaeus 1758)
Yellow-legged tortoiseshell, Nymphalis xanthomelas (Denis & Schiffermüller, 1775)
False comma, Nymphalis vaualbum ([Denis & Schiffermüller], 1775)
Comma, Polygonia c-album (Linnaeus 1758)
Southern comma, Polygonia egea (Cramer 1775)
Red admiral, Vanessa atalanta (Linnaeus 1758)
Canary red admiral, Vanessa vulcania Godart, 1819
Painted lady, Vanessa cardui (Linnaeus 1758)
American painted lady, Vanessa virginiensis (Drury, 1773)

Tribe Melitaeini
Scarce fritillary, Euphydryas maturna (Linnaeus 1758)
Asian fritillary, Euphydryas intermedia (Ménétriés, 1859)
Euphydryas italica Back, Haussmann, Salk & Weiss, 2015
Cynthia's fritillary, Euphydryas cynthia (Denis & Schiffermüller 1775)
Lapland fritillary, Euphydryas iduna (Dalman, 1816)
Marsh fritillary, Euphydryas aurinia (Rottemburg, 1775)
Spanish marsh fritillary, Euphydryas beckeri (Lederer, 1853)
Spanish fritillary, Euphydryas desfontainii (Godart, 1819)
Euphydryas orientalis (Herrich-Schäffer, 1851)
Spotted fritillary, Melitaea didyma (Esper, 1778)
Freyer's fritillary, Melitaea arduinna (Esper, [1783])
Lesser spotted fritillary, Melitaea trivia (Denis & Schiffermüller, 1775)
Aetherie fritillary, Melitaea aetherie (Hübner 1826)
Knapweed fritillary, Melitaea phoebe (Denis & Schiffermüller, 1775)
Jerusalem fritillary, Melitaea telona (Fruhstorfer, 1908)
Little fritillary, Melitaea asteria (Freyer, 1828)
Heath fritillary, Melitaea athalia (Rottemburg, 1775)
Nickerl's fritillary, Melitaea aurelia Nickerl, 1850
Assman's fritillary, Melitaea britomartis (Assmann, 1847)
Provençal fritillary, Melitaea deione (Geyer, 1832)
Melitaea nevadensis Oberthür, 1904
Glanville fritillary, Melitaea cinxia (Linnaeus, 1758)
False heath fritillary, Melitaea diamina (Lang, 1789)
Meadow fritillary, Melitaea parthenoides Keferstein, 1851
Grisons fritillary, Melitaea varia Meyer-Dur, 1851
Sicilian fritillary, Melitaea ornata Christoph, 1893

Subfamily Heliconiinae
Silver-washed fritillary, Argynnis paphia (Linnaeus, 1758)
Pallas' fritillary, Argynnis laodice (Pallas, 1771)
Cardinal, Argynnis pandora (Denis & Schiffermüller 1775)
Mountain fritillary, Boloria alaskensis (Holland, 1900) North Russia
Cranberry fritillary, Boloria aquilonaris Stichel, 1908
Balkan fritillary, Boloria graeca (Staudinger, 1870)
Mountain fritillary, Boloria napaea (Hoffmannsegg, 1804)
Shepherd's fritillary, Boloria pales (Denis & Schiffermüller, 1775)
Erschoff's fritillary, Boloria angarensis (Erschoff, 1870) North and East Russia
Arctic fritillary, Boloria chariclea Schneider, 1794
Violet fritillary, Boloria dia (Linnaeus, 1767)
Pearl-bordered fritillary, Boloria euphrosyne (Linnaeus, 1758)
Freija fritillary, Boloria freija (Becklin in Thunberg, 1791)
Frigga fritillary, Boloria frigga Becklin in Thunberg, 1791
Dingy fritillary, Boloria improba Butler, 1877
Boloria oscarus (Eversmann, 1844) Russia (Urals)
Polaris fritillary, Boloria polaris Boisduval, 1828
Small pearl-bordered fritillary, Boloria selene (Denis & Schiffermüller, 1775)
Boloria selenis (Eversmann, 1837) Russia
Thor's fritillary, Boloria thore (Hübner, 1803)
Purple bog fritillary, Boloria titania (Esper, 1793)
Boloria tritonia (Böber, 1812) North Russia 
Ocellate bog fritillary, Boloria eunomia (Esper, 1799)
Marbled fritillary, Brenthis daphne (Bergstrasser, 1780)
Twin-spot fritillary, Brenthis hecate (Denis & Schiffermüller, 1775)
Lesser marbled fritillary, Brenthis ino (Rottemburg, 1775)
High brown fritillary, Fabriciana adippe (Denis & Schiffermüller 1775)
Corsican fritillary, Fabriciana elisa (Godart, [1824])
Niobe fritillary, Fabriciana niobe (Linnaeus, 1758)
Queen of Spain, Issoria lathonia (Linnaeus, 1758)
Issoria eugenia (Eversmann, 1847) North European Russia
Dark green fritillary, Speyeria aglaja (Linnaeus, 1758)

Subfamily Charaxinae
Two-tailed pasha, Charaxes jasius (Linnaeus, 1767)

Subfamily Danainae
Plain tiger, Danaus chrysippus (Linnaeus, 1758)
Monarch, Danaus plexippus (Linnaeus, 1758)

Subfamily Apaturinae
Lesser purple emperor, Apatura ilia (Denis & Schiffermüller 1775)
Purple emperor, Apatura iris (Linnaeus, 1758)
Freyer's purple emperor, Apatura metis Freyer, 1829

Subfamily Libytheinae
Nettle-tree butterfly, Libythea celtis (Laicharting, 1782)

Subfamily Limenitidinae
White admiral, Limenitis camilla (Linnaeus, 1764)
Poplar admiral, Limenitis populi (Linnaeus, 1758)
Southern white admiral, Limenitis reducta Staudinger, 1901
Hungarian glider, Neptis rivularis (Scopoli 1763)
Pallas' sailer, Neptis sappho (Pallas 1771)

Subfamily Satyrinae
Speckled wood, Pararge aegeria (Linnaeus, 1758) 
Madeiran speckled wood, Pararge xiphia (Fabricius, 1775) 
Canary speckled wood, Pararge xiphioides Staudinger, 1871 
Wall, Lasiommata megera (Linnaeus, 1767)
Large wall, Lasiommata maera (Linnaeus, 1758)
Northern wall brown, Lasiommata petropolitana (Fabricius, 1787)
Corsican wall brown, Lasiommata paramegaera (Hübner, 1824)
Woodland brown, Lopinga achine (Scopoli, 1763)
Lopinga deidamia (Eversmann, 1851)
Iranian argus, Kirinia climene (Esper, [1783])
Lattice brown, Kirinia roxelana (Cramer, 1777)
Stoll's heath, Coenonympha amaryllis (Stoll, 1782) South European Russia
Large heath, Coenonympha tullia (Muller, 1764)
False ringlet, Coenonympha oedippus (Fabricius, 1787)
Pearly heath, Coenonympha arcania (Linnaeus, 1761)
Corsican heath, Coenonympha corinna (Hübner, 1804)
Dusky heath, Coenonympha dorus (Esper, 1782)
Alpine heath, Coenonympha gardetta (de Prunner, 1798)
Chestnut heath, Coenonympha glycerion (Borkhausen, 1788)
Scarce heath, Coenonympha hero Linnaeus, 1761
Russian heath, Coenonympha leander (Esper, 1784)
Small heath, Coenonympha pamphilus (Linnaeus, 1758)
Eastern large heath, Coenonympha rhodopensis Elwes, 1900
Cretan small heath, Coenonympha thyrsis Freyer, 1845
Balkan heath, Coenonympha orientalis (Rebel, 1910)
Siberian heath, Coenonympha phryne (Pallas, 1771) Central and South European Russia
False Mnestra ringlet, Erebia aethiopellus (Hoffmannsegg, 1806)
Scotch argus, Erebia aethiops (Esper, 1777)
Almond-eyed ringlet, Erebia alberganus (de Prunner, 1798)
Lorkovic's brassy ringlet, Erebia calcaria Lorkovic, 1953
Common brassy ringlet, Erebia cassioides cassioides (Reiner & Hochenwarth, 1792)
Raetzer's ringlet, Erebia christi Ratzer, 1890
White speck ringlet, Erebia claudina (Borkhausen, 1789) Austria
Erebia cyclopius (Eversmann, 1844) North and East European Russia 
Erebia dabanensis Erschoff, 1871 North European Russia 
Arctic ringlet, Erebia disa (Thunberg, 1791)
Red-disked alpine, Erebia discoidalis (Kirby, 1837) North European Russia 
Erebia edda Ménétriés, 1851 North European Russia 
Lapland ringlet, Erebia embla (Becklin, 1791)
Small mountain ringlet, Erebia epiphron (Knoch, 1783)
Spring ringlet, Erebia epistygne (Hübner, 1824)
Eriphyle ringlet, Erebia eriphyle (Freyer, 1836)
Large ringlet, Erebia euryale (Esper, 1805)
Banded alpine, Erebia fasciata Butler, 1868
Yellow-banded ringlet, Erebia flavofasciata Heyne, 1895
Silky ringlet, Erebia gorge (Hübner 1804)
Lefèbvre's ringlet, Erebia lefebvrei (Boisduval, [1828])
Arran brown, Erebia ligea (Linnaeus, 1758)
Yellow-spotted ringlet, Erebia manto (Denis & Schiffermüller, 1775)
Woodland ringlet, Erebia medusa (Denis & Schiffermüller, 1775)
Lesser mountain ringlet, Erebia melampus (Fuessly 1775)
Black ringlet, Erebia melas (Herbst 1796)
Piedmont ringlet, Erebia meolans (Prunner, 1798)
Mnestra's ringlet, Erebia mnestra (Hübner 1804)
Marbled ringlet, Erebia montanus (de Prunner, 1798)
Autumn ringlet, Erebia neoridas (Boisduval, 1828)
de Lesse's brassy ringlet, Erebia nivalis Lorkovic & De Lesse, 1954
Bright eyed ringlet, Erebia oeme (Hübner, 1804)
Ottoman brassy ringlet, Erebia ottomana Herrich-Schäffer, 1847
Dewy ringlet, Erebia pandrose (Borkhausen, 1788)
Blind ringlet, Erebia pharte (Hübner, 1804)
Sooty ringlet, Erebia pluto (de Prunner, 1798)
Water ringlet, Erebia pronoe (Esper, 1780)
Larche ringlet, Erebia scipio Boisduval, 1832
False dewy ringlet, Erebia sthennyo Graslin, 1850
Styrian ringlet, Erebia stirius (Godart, 1824)
Stygian ringlet, Erebia styx (Freyer, 1834)
de Prunner's ringlet, Erebia triarius (de Prunner, 1798)
Swiss brassy ringlet, Erebia tyndarus (Esper, 1781)
Dalmatian ringlet, Proterebia afra (Fabricius, 1787) European Russia, Croatia, Greece
Ringlet, Aphantopus hyperantus (Linnaeus, 1758)
Southern gatekeeper, Pyronia cecilia (Vallantin, 1894)	
Gatekeeper, Pyronia tithonus (Linnaeus, 1767)
Spanish gatekeeper, Pyronia bathseba (Fabricius, 1793)
Oriental meadow brown, Hyponephele lupinus (O. Costa 1836)
Dusky meadow brown, Hyponephele lycaon (Rottemburg 1775)
Koçak's meadow brown, Hyponephele huebneri Koçak, 1980 South European Russia 
Aegean meadow brown, Maniola chia Thomson, 1987
Meadow brown, Maniola jurtina (Linnaeus 1758)
Halicarnas brown, Maniola halicarnassus Thomson, 1990 Nisyros Island, Greece 
Cyprus meadow brown, Maniola cypricola Thomson, 1990 Cyprus 
Turkish meadow brown, Maniola megala (Oberthür, 1909) Greece 
Sardinian meadow brown, Maniola nurag Ghiliani, 1852 Sardinia
Dodecanese meadow brown, Maniola telmessia (Zeller, 1847) Dodecanese and North Aegean
Marbled white, Melanargia galathea (Linnaeus, 1758)
Western marbled white, Melanargia occitanica (Esper, 1793)
Esper's marbled white, Melanargia russiae (Esper, 1783)
Italian marbled white, Melanargia arge (Sulzer, 1776)
Spanish marbled white, Melanargia ines (Hoffmannsegg, 1804)
Iberian marbled white, Melanargia lachesis (Hübner, 1790)
Balkan marbled white, Melanargia larissa (Geyer, 1828)
Sicilian marbled white, Melanargia pherusa (Boisduval, 1833) Sicily
Black satyr, Satyrus actaea (Esper, 1781)
Great sooty satyr, Satyrus ferula (Fabricius, 1793)
Russian grayling, Hipparchia autonoe (Esper, 1784)
Woodland grayling, Hipparchia fagi (Scopoli 1763)
Rock grayling, Hipparchia hermione (Linnaeus, 1764)
Hipparchia neomiris (Godart, 1822)
Eastern rock grayling, Hipparchia syriaca (Staudinger, 1871)
Freyer's grayling, Hipparchia fatua Freyer, 1844
Tree grayling, Hipparchia statilinus (Hufnagel, 1766)
Southern grayling, Hipparchia aristaeus (Bonelli, 1826) 
Azores grayling, Hipparchia azorina (Strecker, 1899)
Sicilian grayling, Hipparchia blachieri (Frühstorfer, 1908)
Karpathos grayling, Hipparchia christenseni Kudrna, 1977 Karpathos, Greece
Cretan grayling, Hipparchia cretica (Rebel, 1916) Crete
Cyprus grayling, Hipparchia cypriensis (Holik, 1949) Cyprus
Eolian grayling, Hipparchia leighebi Kudrna, 1976 Eolian Islands of Italy (Volcano and Panarea)
Madeiran grayling, Hipparchia maderensis (Bethune-Baker, 1891)
Samos grayling, Hipparchia mersina (Staudinger, 1871) Lesbos and Samos, Greece 
Le Cerf's grayling, Hipparchia miguelensis (Le Cerf, 1935) Sao Miguel, Azores
Hipparchia neapolitana (Stauder, 1921)
Anatolian grayling, Hipparchia pellucida (Stauder, 1924) Vóreion Aiyáion, North Aegean
Hipparchia sbordonii Kudrna, 1984
Grayling, Hipparchia semele (Linnaeus, 1758)
Balkan grayling, Hipparchia senthes (Fruhstorfer, 1908) Balkans
Delattin's grayling, Hipparchia volgensis (Mazochin-Porshnjakov, 1952) Southeast Europe
El Hierro grayling, Hipparchia bacchus Higgins, 1967 Canary Islands
Striped grayling, Hipparchia fidia (Linnaeus, 1767)
Gomera grayling, Hipparchia gomera Higgins, 1967 Canary Islands
Gran Canaria grayling, Hipparchia tamadabae Owen & Smith, 1992 Canary Islands
La Palma grayling, Hipparchia tilosi (Manil, 1984) Canary Islands
Canary grayling, Hipparchia wyssii (Christ, 1889) Canary Islands
Dryad, Minois dryas (Scopoli, 1763)
False grayling, Arethusana arethusa (Denis & Schiffermüller, 1775)
Great banded grayling, Brintesia circe (Fabricius, 1775)
Arctic grayling, Oeneis bore (Schneider, 1792)
Alpine grayling, Oeneis glacialis (Moll, 1783)
Baltic grayling, Oeneis jutta (Hübner, [1806-1806])
Melissa Arctic, Oeneis melissa (Fabricius, 1775) North European Russia
Graeser's grayling, Oeneis magna Graeser, 1888 North European Russia
Norse grayling, Oeneis norna (Thunberg, 1791) North European Russia, Scandinavia
Norique Alpin, Oeneis polixenes (Fabricius, 1775) North European Russia
Oeneis tarpeia (Pallas, 1771) Central and South European Russia
Hermit, Chazara briseis (Linnaeus 1764)
Dark rockbrown, Chazara persephone (Hübner, [1805])
Southern hermit, Chazara prieuri (Pierret, 1837)
Brown's grayling Pseudochazara amymone Brown, 1976
Pseudochazara anthelea (Hübner, 1824)
Pseudochazara beroe (Herrich-Schäffer, 1844)
Macedonian grayling, Pseudochazara cingovskii Gross, 1973
Crimean grayling, Pseudochazara euxina (Kuznetzov, 1909)
Grey Asian grayling, Pseudochazara geyeri (Herrich-Schäffer, 1846)
Pseudochazara graeca (Staudinger, 1870)
Pseudochazara hippolyte (Esper, 1783)
Tawny rockbrown, Pseudochazara mniszechii (Herrich-Schäffer, 1851)
Dils' grayling, Pseudochazara orestes De Prins & van der Poorten, 1981
Nevada grayling, Pseudochazara williamsi (Romei, 1927)
Satyrus virbius (Herrich-Schäffer, 1844) South European Russia
Ypthima asterope (Klug, 1832) Cyprus, Dodecanese, North Aegean Islands

References

Bozano, G.C. Guide to the Butterflies of the Palearctic Region. Milan: Omnes Artes. incomplete (parts in progress) some parts available as e-books.
Higgins, L.G. & Riley, N.D. (1970). A Field Guide to the Butterflies of Britain and Europe. Collins 
Higgins, L.G., (1975). The Classification of European Butterflies. London, Collins, 320 pp. 
Kudrna O., Ed. Butterflies of Europe. Aula Verlag, Wiesbaden 8 volumes
Tshikolovets, V.V. Butterflies of Europe and Mediterranean Area. Tshikolovets, Kiev

Further reading
Seitz, A., 1912a-1927. Die Palaearktischen Tagfalter. Grossschmetterlinge Erde 1: 8-379 online in English

External links
Butterflies of the Caucasus region and south of Russia
Euroleps Butterflies of the Palearctic
Insecta.pro > Catalogue> Europe> 1000 per page
Seitz, A. Die Gross-Schmetterlinge der Erde 13: Die Palaearktischen Tagfalter. Plates
Seitz, A. Die Gross-Schmetterlinge der Erde 13: Die Palaearktischen Tagfalter. Text (as search available pdf pdf)
fauna-eu[.org] Fauna Europaea Excludes Russian Far East. Includes 1. North European Russia: Murmanskaya Oblast, Kareliya Respublika, Arkhangel'skaya Oblast, inland incl. Nenetskiy Avtonomnyy Okrug, excluding Nova Zemlya and Franz Josef Land which are treated separately), Komi Respublika, Vologodskaya Oblast 2. Northwest European Russia: Leningradskaya Oblast, Pskovskaya Oblast, Novgorodskaya Oblast 3. Central European Russia: Kostromskaya Oblast, Tverskaya Oblast, Yarovslavskaya Oblast, Ivanovskaya Oblast, Nizhegorodskaya Oblast, Vladimirskaya Oblast, Smolenskaya Oblast, Moskovskaya Oblast, Ryazanskaya Oblast, Mordoviya Respublika, Chuvashkaya Respublika, Ul'yanovskaya Oblast, Kaluzhskaya Oblast, Tul'skaya Oblast, Lipetskaya Oblast, Tambovskaya Oblast, Penzenskaya Oblast, Bryanskaya Oblast, Orlovskaya Oblast, Kurskaya Oblast, Voronezhskaya Oblast, Belgorodskaya Oblast 4. East European Russia: Kirovskaya Oblast, Permskaya Oblast (incl. Komi-Permyatskiy Avtonomnyy Okrug), Udmurtskaya Respublika, Bashkortostan Respublika, Mariy El Respublika, Tatarstan Respublika, Samarskaya Oblast, Orenburgskaya Oblast 5. South European Russia: Saratovskaya Oblast, Volgogradskaya Oblast, Astrakhanskaya Oblast, Rostovskaya Oblast, Kalmykiya Respublika 6. Kaliningradskaya Oblast (between Poland and Lithuania) 7. Novaya Zemlya 8. Franz Josef Land (excl. Ushakova I. and Vize I.)

See also
List of butterflies of Europe (Lycaenidae)

 
Europe, Nymphalidae